Tantallon is a village in the Canadian province of Saskatchewan within the Rural Municipality of Spy Hill No. 152 and Census Division No. 5. It is in the Qu'Appelle Valley along the Qu'Appelle River about 39 km east of Round Lake (Saskatchewan). The community celebrated its centennial in 2004. 

The community was founded in 1904 and takes its name from a homestead (which was named "Tantallon" by Scottish Canadian James Moffat Douglas (former Canadian MP and Senator), who said this part of the Qu'Appelle Valley reminded him of Tantallon Castle in Scotland.

The village has an ice rink and a senior's centre. The community's school closed due to a lack of students, who are now bused to Esterhazy.

History 
Tantallon incorporated as a village on June 17, 1904.

Demographics 

References 

Villages in Saskatchewan
Spy Hill No. 152, Saskatchewan
Division No. 5, Saskatchewan
Icelandic settlements in Saskatchewan